Adal is a domesticated breed of fat-tailed sheep from Ethiopia.  They are bred mostly for their meat.

Characteristics
The Adal is unicolored from white to dark brown. They have short ears often appearing to have none. At birth, males are on average  and ewes .

It is especially adapted to arid, dry climates.  Rams and ewes are polled (hornless).  The Adal is classified as a fat-tailed hair breed and has short, stiff fibers.

References

Sheep breeds
Sheep breeds originating in Ethiopia